Anne V. Simonett (1952–1995) was an American lawyer and judge from Minnesota. She was the first woman to be Chief Judge of the Minnesota Court of Appeals.

The daughter of the Minnesota Supreme Court Justice John E. Simonett, Anne Simonett received a degree in music from Lawrence University in Appleton, Wisconsin. She received a master's degree in music performance, graduating magna cum laude from Yale University. She received her law degree from Harvard University in 1981.

Simonett worked in business litigation for Faegre and Benson and became a partner. She was appointed a trial court judge in Minnesota's Fourth Judicial District.  In 1994 Governor Arne Carlson named her to be Chief Judge of the Minnesota Court of Appeals, succeeding Chief Judge Paul H. Anderson, who had been appointed to the Minnesota Supreme Court.

During her first year in office, Simonett was diagnosed with an incurable brain tumor. She resigned on March 31, 1995, and died on May 6 the same year. She was survived by her husband, Henry Shea, and their two children, Henry (H.J.) and Claire.

References
Law Library Biography

1952 births
1995 deaths
People from Little Falls, Minnesota
Lawrence University alumni
Yale University alumni
Harvard Law School alumni
Minnesota lawyers
Minnesota Court of Appeals judges
20th-century American lawyers
20th-century American judges
20th-century American women lawyers
20th-century American women judges